Megachile macneilli is a species of bee in the family Megachilidae. It was described by Mitchell in 1957.

References

Macneilli
Insects described in 1957